Harry Schumm (September 27, 1877 – April 4, 1953) was an American silent film actor. He appeared in almost 50 films between 1913 and 1920. He was born in Chicago, Illinois, and died in Los Angeles, California.

Selected filmography
 A Forest Romance (1913)
 For the Peace of Bear Valley (1913)
 Lucille Love, Girl of Mystery (1914)
 The Hazards of Helen (1914)
 The Mysterious Rose (1914)
 The Broken Coin (1915)
 The Double Hold-Up (1919)
 West Is Best (1920)
 The Path She Chose (1920)

References

External links

1877 births
1953 deaths
Male actors from Illinois
American male film actors
American male silent film actors
20th-century American male actors